The Berkeley City Club was commissioned as the club house of the Berkeley Women's City Club, organized in Berkeley, California in 1927 to contribute to social, civic, and cultural progress. This private club is no longer restricted to women, and the club house building is available to the public at large for overnight stays, weddings, and other occasions. On the second floor, the Club also houses Julia's Restaurant and Morgan's Bar & Lounge, led by Executive Chef Fabrice Marcon, MCF.

The building, constructed in 1929 and officially opened in 1930, is one of the outstanding works of noted California architect Julia Morgan. The San Francisco-born Morgan was the first woman to gain admission and earn a certificate from the Ecole de Beaux-Arts in Paris (1902) and the first licensed female architect in California. She designed nearly 100 women's-organization buildings throughout her career.

Her interpretation of Moorish and Gothic elements in the Berkeley Women's City Club created a landmark of California design. It is registered as California Historical Landmark and is listed on the National Register of Historic Places (NPS-77000282). The Berkeley City Club Conservancy cares for the building itself. Along with many other stewards of Julia Morgan properties, BCCC joined in the California Cultural and Historical Endowment's Julia Morgan 2012 Project.

References 
Citations

Further reading

External links 
 
 Julia's Restaurant
 Morgan's Bar & Lounge

Clubhouses in California
Julia Morgan buildings
Women's club buildings in California
Buildings and structures in Berkeley, California
Clubs and societies in California
Women's clubs in the United States
1927 establishments in California
Buildings and structures completed in 1929
California Historical Landmarks
Clubhouses on the National Register of Historic Places in California
National Register of Historic Places in Berkeley, California
History of women in California
Gothic Revival architecture in California